Richard Salveyn (aka Richard Salvin) was a Master of University College, Oxford, England.

Salveyn was from a Durham family. He was a Fellow of University College and became Master of the college in June 1547. He resigned from the position in October 1551. He was not a supporter of the Reformation and was later deprived of his livings in the reign of Queen Elizabeth I.

Anthony Salveyn, Master of University College from 1557 to 1558, was probably Richard Salveyn's brother.

References 

Year of birth missing
Year of death missing
16th-century English educators
People from Durham, England
Fellows of University College, Oxford
Masters of University College, Oxford